Lawrence Mintoff is a Maltese judge.

See also
 Judiciary of Malta

References

External links
http://www.independent.com.mt/articles/2019-05-12/newspaper-letters/Shocking-sentence-by-Judge-Lawrence-Mintoff-6736207951
http://www.independent.com.mt/articles/2014-07-22/opinions/mr-justice-lawrence-mintoff-5927075842/

Living people
20th-century Maltese judges
21st-century Maltese judges
Year of birth missing (living people)
Place of birth missing (living people)